Angstrem is a Russian variant of transcription of the Swedish surname Ångström (Angstrom), which may refer to:

Angstrem (company), a Russian integrated circuits manufacturer
Angstrem Stadium, a Russian football stadium, the home stadium of FC Zelenograd

See also
 Ångström (disambiguation)